Navy SEALS is a 1990 American military action film, directed by Lewis Teague, written by Chuck Pfarrer and Gary Goldman, and produced by Brenda Feigen and Bernard Williams with consultant William Bradley. The film stars Charlie Sheen, Michael Biehn, Joanne Whalley-Kilmer, Rick Rossovich, Cyril O'Reilly, Bill Paxton, and Dennis Haysbert.

Plot
The , an aircraft carrier on station in the eastern Mediterranean Sea, receives a mayday from a civilian cargo ship named Kuwaiti Star. The ship reports that they have been attacked, are on fire and adrift. A deployed Navy SH-3 helicopter attempts to rescue the crew, but is downed by a gunboat and the aircrew is captured.

Meanwhile, United States Navy SEALs Dale Hawkins (Charlie Sheen), James Curran (Michael Biehn), William "Billy" Graham (Dennis Haysbert), James Leary (Rick Rossovich), Homer Rexer (Cyril O'Reilly), Floyd "God" Dane (Bill Paxton), and Ramos (Paul Sanchez) are recovering from a bachelor party. Graham is to be married, but the wedding is canceled at the last minute when the whole team is paged to rescue the captured aircrew.

In the Mediterranean, the leader of the terrorists that shot at the Navy helicopter, Ben Shaheed (Nicholas Kadi), orders the killing of the hostages. One crewmember is killed on the spot and another is beaten up, but the SEAL team arrives just in time to prevent any further kills. Reacting to a suspicious noise, Hawkins breaks silence when he encounters Shaheed in an adjoining room, inadvertently alerting the terrorists.

Shaheed claims to be an Egyptian sailor also being held by the terrorists and is left by the SEALs. As the SEALs evacuate the hostages from the area, Hawkins and Graham stumble across a warehouse containing Stinger missiles. Hawkins attempts to return to the warehouse to destroy the missiles, only to be ordered by Curran to proceed with extraction.

On board an aircraft carrier later that night, the individual team members are debriefed by Naval Intelligence. Curran's decision to leave the Stinger missiles behind is questioned, but Curran retorts that his primary mission was to rescue the aircrew and that Naval Intelligence did not do their job properly. Meanwhile, Hawkins is highly agitated by the mission and has trouble dealing with the emotional upheaval the mission provided. Curran tries to calm him down but is rebuffed by Hawkins.

At the Pentagon, Shaheed is seen in a video interview. The Joint Chiefs of Staff identify Shaheed and his organization, Al Shuhadah. They also identify the interviewer as Claire Varrens (Joanne Whalley-Kilmer), a journalist and author who is half Lebanese. Her questioning of Shaheed yields an admission that he and his group participated in the bombing of the Marine barracks in Lebanon in 1983. Shaheed admits the complicity freely, saying they only sought revenge for the bombing of their homes by Navy ships and warplanes.

The Joint Chiefs are briefed on the recent mission and Curran requests permission to destroy the Stingers, but Navy Intelligence has learned they have already been relocated. The SEALs are ordered on R&R and enjoy a game of golf. Curran, brooding over the previous mission, reads a book authored by Varrens. During the golf outing, Graham convinces his fiancée (S. Epatha Merkerson) to try to finish the wedding, regardless of the hazards of Graham's job.

The team receives their orders for the next mission. Naval Intelligence has heard that the Stinger missiles are on board a merchant ship, the Latanya, off the coast of Syria. The SEALs deploy from a submerged submarine, the USS Nyack, and successfully board the ship, neutralizing two disguised gunmen, only to find out from an EOD team that the missiles are not on board after all.

Frustrated by the recent unreliable intelligence, Curran solicits Varrens's cooperation. Curran takes Claire on a tour of a SEAL training facility and attempts to woo her over an elegant dinner. Claire is initially wary but opens up to Curran after learning that a Stinger has been used to shoot down a peace delegation in Lebanon. Claire provides pictures of men she has encountered who may possibly provide information that may lead the SEALs to the location of the missiles.

While trying to identify possible contacts, Claire tells Curran and Hawkins that one of her contacts is missing, most likely having been kidnapped by the Israelis. Inspired by this, and an outburst by Hawkins, Curran presents the idea of kidnapping a potential informant to his superiors who subsequently recommend the proposal at a National Security Council meeting. A CIA executive at the meeting identifies one of the targets as a known CIA informant who could be co-opted if taken into custody. On that basis, the SEALs are authorized to bring him in.

The SEALs infiltrate the area by performing a HALO jump and swimming to shore. Curran leads several of the team inside a house to secure the informant while Hawkins, Ramos, and Graham remain outside. When Ramos is pinned down by patrolling militia, Hawkins disobeys Curran's order to stay quiet and instigates a firefight. Although Hawkins finally succeeds in killing the militiamen, Graham is killed during the firefight.

Curran informs Graham's fiancée of his death, and a funeral with full military honors is held. After the wake, the men drown their sorrows at a local bar. Hawkins gives a toast to Graham for being the best friend a guy could have. Curran scolds Hawkins for his carelessness that caused Graham's death. Later, Claire arrives at Curran's houseboat to find a still grieving Curran, leading to a night of intimacy. Curran quietly leaves the next morning with Claire in bed.

Disguised as Lebanese militiamen, the SEALs are deployed by submarine to Beirut, coming ashore at its seafront on Zodiac rubber inflatable boats, this time to meet a local resistance fighter from the AMAL militia who will guide them to the building containing the Stingers. Although Dane is killed while attempting to set up a sniping overwatch position, the SEALs locate the Stingers in an old school building in a heavily bombed area of the city. Curran leads Leary and Rexer inside the building to destroy the missiles while Hawkins and Ramos maintain overwatch outside. Hawkins shoots a local gunman questioning him, alerting the terrorists.

Leaving the building, Curran gets shot in the abdomen and thigh. Curran is pinned down near the building door and orders Hawkins to destroy the building regardless of Curran's being in the blast radius. Hawkins disobeys the order and rescues Curran while the other SEALs provide suppressing fire before the building is finally destroyed.

The SEALs commandeer a civilian Mercedes-Benz W123 car and attempt to exfiltrate from the city while evading pursuit by an enemy BTR-152 Armoured Personnel Carrier (APC) armed with a twin Browning M1919A4 .30 Cal machine gun mount. The car is eventually hit by machine gunfire and Rexer killed by a stray bullet to the head. Leary, using a recovered Stinger missile launcher, manages to destroy the APC, and the four remaining SEALs escape to the beach.

Shaheed steals a boat from a pier-side fisherman and follows the SEALs across the water. He spots Curran's body floating in the sea. As he attempts to pull the body from the water he is attacked by the SEALs and, in an underwater fight, Hawkins kills Shaheed. The other SEALs take out the remaining topside terrorists and destroy the small boat. With the mission finally accomplished, the designated exfiltration submarine surfaces, recovering the SEALs.

Cast

 Charlie Sheen as Lieutenant Junior Grade Dale Hawkins, the second in command of the Navy SEAL team.
 Michael Biehn as Lieutenant James Curran, the commander of the Navy SEAL team.
 Joanne Whalley-Kilmer as Claire Varrens
 Rick Rossovich as HM3(SEAL) James Leary: Corpsman
 Cyril O'Reilly as HT1(SEAL)  Homer Rexer: Explosives
 Bill Paxton as MM2(SEAL) Floyd "God" Dane: Sniper
 Dennis Haysbert as OSC(SEAL/SW) William "Billy" Graham: Team Chief
 Paul Sanchez as RM3 Ramos: Communications and Arabic interpreter
 Nicholas Kadi as Ben Shaheed
 Ronald G. Joseph as Captain Ryan Dunne: Navy SEAL Commander
 S. Epatha Merkerson as Jolena (a.k.a. Jo), Chief Graham's fiance
 Gregory McKinney as U.S. Helicopter Pilot
 Rob Moran as U.S. Helicopter Co-Pilot
 Richard Venture as Rear Admiral Colker

Production
In the winter of 1986 Brenda Feigen, then an agent at the William Morris Agency, was introduced to Chuck Pfarrer through one of her clients. Pfarrer, an active-duty navy SEAL who wrote screenplays in his spare time, had just sold "The Crook Factory," a script about Ernest Hemingway's life. Feigen encouraged him to write a script based on his experiences. After retiring from the SEALs, Pfarrer wrote the script, which Feigen shopped to Orion Pictures, Warner Brothers, and United Artists, hoping to create a bidding war. Orion ultimately purchased the script, with Feigen acting as producer.

Feigen wanted Ridley Scott to direct, but negotiations fell through. Producers met with Roger Donaldson, but he didn’t like the script, Richard Marquand was then hired, but his death in 1987 stopped pre-production until Lewis Teague was brought in as a replacement.

Several screenwriters were brought on to do rewrites. Gary Goldman wrote a new draft with Pfarrer, taking influence from the 1961 film The Guns of Navarone, and the 1982 film An Officer and a Gentleman. Kevin Jarre was approached to do a rewrite, but initially declined due to the 1988 Writer's Strike. Once the strike ended in August 1988, Jarre turned in his draft, which was considered stronger, but the producers had concerns about the script, mainly a line of dialogue that was deemed sexist, and lacking in character depth. Angelo Pizzo was then brought on to flesh out and develop the main characters. Rewrites continued well into production, with uncredited script doctors and even actors Charlie Sheen and Michael Biehn reportedly rewriting scenes Ultimately, only Pfarrer and Goldman received credit on the final film.

The actors underwent a two-week training course in Northern Virginia, taking part in field maneuvers and weapons training. Eight former Navy SEALs were hired as technical advisors to train the actors and occasionally perform stunts.

Principal Photography began in the fall of 1989 in Virginia Beach and near Naval Station Norfolk, in Norfolk, Virginia. In November 1989, filming moved to Southern Spain, utilizing the Mediterranean ports of Tarifa, Cádiz, and Cartagena. The Spanish Navy provided submarines, battleships and helicopters, whereas the Spanish Army provided tanks, APCs and background actors. Chosen because of its Moorish Revival architecture, Cartagena's old inner city stood in for Beirut, Lebanon. Teague used up to seven camera crews filming simultaneously in several action scenes.

Reception

Release
Navy SEALs was released in theaters on July 20, 1990.

Box office
The movie was not a box office success, debuting at No. 4 and grossing $6.5 million the first week, eventually grossing $25 million domestically, just barely above its reported budget of $21 million.

Critical response
The movie received negative reviews from critics. At the review aggregator website Rotten Tomatoes, the film holds an 18% "Rotten" rating, based on 33 critics' reviews, which are summarized thus: "a non-winning military recruitment propaganda movie that happens to star Charlie Sheen and Michael Biehn." Some reviews have been more positive: Allmovie notes that "Viewers seeking rapidly paced action sequences will not be disappointed" The film received three out of four stars on UK Virgin Television.

The film was more successful on home video with a VHS released on January 31, 1991. A Blu-ray was released in 2009 in United States.

Michael Biehn expressed his dislike of the film in a 2012 interview: "We wanted to make a really good movie, and it really turned out to be kind of a mish-mash and not a very good movie at all. So it’s really kind of... yeah, it’s probably the worst experience of my life, working on that movie... The script could've been shaped to be much better, and you just hate to see all that talent and passion go to waste."

The movie is lampooned in Clerks, when the character Randall complains about video store customers who "always pick the most intellectually devoid movies on the racks" and one is shown reacting excitedly to a tape of Navy Seals.

Former Navy SEAL Operator Andy Stumpf, in a review of the movie, points out that, after the opening scene, when Charlie Sheen's character "Hawkins" awakes still drunk and hungover on a beach that this is the only realistic part of the movie which portrays life in the Teams.

Other media

Video Game

A shoot 'em up platform video game developed and published by Ocean Software was released in the United Kingdom for the Amstrad CPC, Amstrad GX4000 and Commodore 64 in 1990. It was later re-released in the rest of Europe for the ZX Spectrum, Atari ST and Amiga home computers in the following year. It was then ported to the Game Boy on 1 September 1991 in the United States. The game is based on the film and follows the protagonist, Lieutenant Dale Hawkins, progressing through five side-scrolling levels.

See also

List of films featuring the United States Navy SEALs

References

External links

 
Navy SEALs military and civilian vehicles

1990 films
1990s action war films
American action war films
1990s English-language films
American war adventure films
Films directed by Lewis Teague
Films about terrorism in the United States
Films about jihadism
Films shot in Almería
Films shot in Virginia
Films shot in Israel
Films set in Lebanon
Films set in Virginia
Orion Pictures films
Films about United States Navy SEALs
Films scored by Sylvester Levay
Films with screenplays by Gary Goldman (screenwriter)
1990s American films